Chornomorets is a Ukrainian (previously Soviet) football club based in Odesa, southern Ukraine. The FC Chornomorets Odesa in European football debuted in 1975 originally representing the Soviet Union. They have taken part in UEFA-sanctioned cup competition about dozen times. Following dissolution of the Soviet Union in late 1991, it represents Ukraine.

History

1975–76 UEFA Cup
As league third place runners-up in the 1974 season, Chornomorets qualified for the UEFA Cup for the first time in 1975–76, alongside [at that time] fellow Soviet clubs both from Moscow – Spartak and Torpedo. Faced with S.S. Lazio of Italy, the Odesa footballers were successful at their debut at home 1–0 with the first half strike from Anatoliy Doroshenko, but in away game at Stadio Olimpico Chornomorets lost in extra time 0–3 with Giorgio Chinaglia scoring hat-trick.

1985–86 UEFA Cup
A finish of fourth in the 1984 season earned Chornomorets a second UEFA Cup campaign. Soviet clubs Spartak Moscow and Dnipro Dnipropetrovsk also qualified for the 1985–86 tournament. Chornomorets's first opponents this time were German club SV Werder Bremen. A 2–1 home win at Tsentralny Stadion ChMP in Odesa and a 2–3 'away' loss at Weserstadion earned the Odesa club a win on away goal rule and a progress to face Spanish club Real Madrid CF. Sailors lost the away leg 1–2 at Estadio Santiago Bernabéu, however a 0–0 draw in Odesa meant that Real progressed due to the aggregate goals advantage.

Overall record
Accurate as of June 19, 2019

Legend: GF = Goals For. GA = Goals Against. GD = Goal Difference.

Results

Statistics by country

Notes

References

Europe
Chornomorets Odesa